Chesterfield is a village in Macoupin County, Illinois, United States. The population was 170 at the 2020 census.

Geography
Illinois Route 111 passes through the village as Main Street, leading north  to Hettick and southwest  to Medora.

The village drains north to Bear Creek, a west-flowing tributary of Hodges Creek and subsequently Macoupin Creek, part of the Illinois River watershed.

Demographics

As of the census of 2000, there were 223 people, 86 households, and 60 families residing in the village. The racial makeup of the village was 97.76% White, 0.45% Native American, and 1.79% from two or more races.

There were 86 households, out of which 34.9% had children under the age of 18 living with them, 48.8% were married couples living together, 14.0% had a female householder with no husband present, and 30.2% were non-families. 24.4% of all households were made up of individuals, and 18.6% had someone living alone who was 65 years of age or older. The average household size was 2.59 and the average family size was 3.05.

In the village, the population was spread out, with 28.7% under the age of 18, 8.1% from 18 to 24, 28.3% from 25 to 44, 15.7% from 45 to 64, and 19.3% who were 65 years of age or older. The median age was 36 years. For every 100 females, there were 84.3 males. For every 100 females age 18 and over, there were 84.9 males.

The median income for a household in the village was $33,125, and the median income for a family was $34,375. Males had a median income of $29,250 versus $25,625 for females. The per capita income for the village was $18,555. About 11.4% of families and 12.1% of the population were below the poverty line, including 11.8% of those under the age of eighteen and 11.8% of those 65 or over.

References

Villages in Macoupin County, Illinois
Villages in Illinois